The Nerbudda incident was the execution of 197 personnel of the British transport ship Nerbudda and brig Ann in Taiwan on 10 August 1842 during the First Opium War. An additional 87 prisoners died from ill treatment in captivity. In September 1841, the Nerbudda became shipwrecked off northern Taiwan near Keelung. In March 1842, the Ann became shipwrecked at Da'an harbour. Survivors from both ships—primarily Indian camp followers and lascars—were captured and marched south to the capital of Taiwan Prefecture, where they were imprisoned before being beheaded. Out of the nearly 300 castaways who landed or attempted to land in Taiwan, only 11 survived captivity and execution. The Daoguang Emperor ordered the execution on 14 May 1842, after the Chinese defeat in Zhejiang.

Background 
In expanding their trading activities in East Asia, the British East India Company viewed Taiwan (Formosa) as a viable trading post with rich resource potential. The Company lobbied the British government to grant a trade monopoly by first occupying the island. In 1840, British national William Huttmann wrote to Foreign Secretary Lord Palmerston that given the strategic and commercial value of the island and the Qing dynasty's benign rule over it, a British warship with less than 1,500 troops could occupy its eastern coast while also developing trade. During the First Opium War, British men-of-war patrolled the Taiwan Strait and the Pescadores.

Shipwrecks

Nerbudda 
In early September 1841, the transport ship Nerbudda set sail from Hong Kong to Chusan (Zhoushan). It had 274 personnel consisting of 243 Indians, 29 Europeans, and two men from Manila. A severe gale dismasted the ship, which drifted towards the northern coast of Taiwan and struck a reef. All the Europeans, accompanied by three Indians and the two Manila men, left the Nerbudda in a row boat, leaving behind 240 Indians (170 camp followers and 70 lascars). The ship, which was supplied with provisions, lay in smooth water in Keelung bay for five days, during which they prepared rafts. In attempting to land, some drowned in the surf, others were killed by plunderers on shore, and the rest were captured by local authorities who separated them into small parties and marched them to the prefectural capital Taiwan (now Tainan). About 150 are thought to have made it on shore. Meanwhile, those in the row boat proceeded along the eastern coast of Taiwan. After being adrift for several days, they were descried by the trading schooner Black Swan and taken to Hong Kong.

The Manchu Brigade General Dahonga (達洪阿) and the Han taotai (intendant) Yao Ying (姚瑩) filed a disingenuous report to the Daoguang Emperor, claiming to have sunk the ship from the Keelung fort while defending against a naval attack on 30 September, with 32 enemies killed and 133 captured. In response, the emperor sent rewards to both commanders. However, the battle never occurred and the people they claimed to have slaughtered were the shipwrecked survivors. Only two ended up surviving (the head and second serang) and being sent to Xiamen (then known by its Hokkien pronunciation as Amoy) after the executions the following year.

Ann 
In March 1842, the brig Ann set sail from Chusan to Macao. It had 57 personnel consisting of 34 Indian natives, 14 European or American natives, five Chinese, and four Portuguese or Malays. Most were seacunnies or lascars. Strong winds drifted the ship on shore and the ebb tide caused it to run aground near Da'an harbour. The crew commandeered a Chinese junk in an attempt to set out to sea, but a gale disrupted the plan, and were soon captured by armed Chinese. Dahonga and Yao Ying again sent a disingenuous report, claiming that fishing vessels destroyed the ship in self-defence. Only nine survivors were spared in the executions in August 1842. In 1843, a list of the names of the 57 crewmen and their fate was published in The Chinese Repository:
43 beheaded
2 died in prison
2 died in the wreck
1 escaped
8 set free to Xiamen (six were European or American natives, one an India native, and one from China)
1 Chinese retained as an interpreter

Rescue attempts 
Between 19–27 October 1841, the British sloop Nimrod sailed to Keelung and offered 100 dollars for every Nerbudda survivor. But after finding out they were sent south for imprisonment, Captain Joseph Pearse ordered the bombardment of the harbour and destroyed 27 sets of cannon before returning to Hong Kong. On 8 October 1842, Commander William Nevill of the Serpent left Xiamen for Taiwan (Tainan). Captain Henry Ducie Chads of the Cambrian ordered him to inquire about the survivors of both ships "under a Flag of Truce". By that time, the British were aware that the captives were already executed. Nevill brought a letter from Chads addressed to the Taiwanese governor, requesting the release of the survivors, but reported that his reception was uncourteous and his letter not accepted. They were told that the last survivors were being sent to Fuzhou. On 12 October, they returned to Xiamen.

When the Serpent arrived in Anping, she found 25 survivors of the 26 crew of the transport ship Herculaneum, Captain Stroyan, which left Singapore on 6 September 1842, carrying coals from Calcutta to the British steamers in Chusan, and been thought lost. Unlike the Nerbudda and Ann survivors, Captain Stroyan and his crew were well-treated, albeit because they knew the fate of many of the other wreck victims, in constant fear of their lives. It is possible, depending on the credibility of contemporary newspaper reports, that the Taiwanese authorities largely spared the European survivors, focusing their executions on the Indian (lascar) crew. The contemporary reports of the rescue of the Herculaneum crew refer to 197 total survivors of the Nerbudda and Ann, 30 having died, 157 having been executed, including eight Britons, one of whom was Robert Gully, the son of prize fighter and MP John Gully, and the 10 survivors who were sent to Xiamen. The Serpent arrived in Xiamen with the Herculaneum survivors on 12 October, the survivors of the Nerbudda and Ann not arriving until 25 October, almost two weeks later.

Execution 

After the Nerbudda survivors were captured, Dahonga and Yao Ying solicited permission from Beijing to execute them as invaders. On 14 May 1842, the Daoguang Emperor released an edict after British forces repulsed the Chinese attempt to recapture Ningbo in Zhejiang province. With regards to the Ann prisoners, he ordered: "after acquiring their confessions, only the leaders of the rebellious yi [barbarians] should be imprisoned. The remaining rebellious yi and the 130-odd that were captured last year shall all be immediately executed in order to release our anger and enliven our hearts." On 10 August, the captives were taken two or three miles outside the city walls. Their execution was reported in The Chinese Repository:

All the rest—one hundred and ninety-seven [prisoners]—were placed at small distances from each other on their knees, their feet in irons and hands manacled behind their backs, thus waiting for the executioners, who went round, and with a kind of two-handed sword cut off their heads without being laid on a block. Afterwards their bodies were all thrown into one grave, and their heads stuck up in cages on the seashore.

87 other prisoners died from ill-treatment while in captivity. Merchant Robert Gully and Captain Frank Denham wrote a journal while they were imprisoned. Gully was executed while Denham survived. On 25 October, one of the freed survivors Mr. Newman received a "leaf" of Gully's log from a Chinese soldier who said it was obtained from Gully's shirt, which was stripped off him at the hour of execution. It contained his last known diary entry, dated 10 August. The journals of Gully and Denham were published in London in 1844. In 1876, a memoir by Dan Patridge, a survivor of the Ann, was also published in London.

Aftermath 
On 23 November 1842, Plenipotentiary Henry Pottinger condemned the massacre of non-combat personnel and demanded that the Taiwanese officials responsible be degraded, punished, and their property confiscated with the amount paid to the British government for compensation to the families of those executed. He stated that he obtained proof the emperor ordered the execution, but that it was due to the Taiwanese authorities falsely reporting that they were a hostile group who attacked the island despite the vessels not being warships and the captured crew not being troops or fighting men. The potential repercussions concerned the Qing government who had just concluded peace negotiations in the Treaty of Nanking a few months earlier. On 11 January 1843, the emperor ordered a judicial inquiry into Dahonga and Yao Ying.

The governor of Fujian and Zhejiang, Yiliang (怡良), was dispatched as commissioner to Taiwan (Tainan). After investigation, he reported that both commanders confessed to sending fabricated reports of defending against a naval attack. In April 1843, they were recalled to the capital Beijing. After being interrogated, they were imprisoned but released by the emperor on 18 October, having served only 12 days. Later that year, Yao Ying claimed that his actions were done to boost the declining morale of the Qing officialdom and troops. On 16 December, Dahonga was assigned to a post at Hami, Xinjiang province, while Yao Ying received an appointment in Sichuan province. The British government were not aware of the postings until Hong Kong Governor John Francis Davis informed Foreign Secretary Lord Aberdeen on 11 March 1845.

In 1867, 25 years after the executions, an interview was published in which British physician William Maxwell asked an old Chinese clerk in a Tainan hong if he remembered the beheadings. He responded in the affirmative and claimed that on the same day, a heavy thunderstorm formed and lasted for three days, drowning an estimated 1,000 to 2,000 people: "I remember that day well, and a black day it was for Formosa ... that was a judgment from Heaven for beheading the Foreigners; but it was done in revenge for your soldiers taking Amoy".

Notes 
Footnotes

Citations

References 

Bate, H. Maclear (1952). Reports from Formosa. New York: E. P. Dutton.
Bernard, W. D.; Hall, W. H. (1847). The Nemesis in China (3rd ed.). London: Henry Colburn.
The Chinese Repository. Volume 11. Canton. 1842.
The Chinese Repository. Volume 12. Canton. 1843.
Davis, John Francis (1852). China, During the War and Since the Peace. Volume 2. London: Longman, Brown, Green, and Longmans.
Fairbank, J. K.; Têng, Ssu-yü (1943). "I-liang". In Hummel, Arthur W. Eminent Chinese of the Ch'ing Period (1644–1912). Washington: U.S. Government Printing Office.
Gordon, Leonard H. D. (2007). Confrontation over Taiwan: Nineteenth-Century China and the Powers. Plymouth: Lexington Books. .
MacPherson, Duncan (1843). Two Years in China (2nd ed.). London: Saunders and Otley.
Mao, Haijian (2016). The Qing Empire and the Opium War. Cambridge: Cambridge University Press. .
Mayers, William; Dennys, N. B.; King, Charles (1867). The Treaty Ports of China and Japan. London: Trubner and Co.
Ouchterlony, John (1844). The Chinese War. London: Saunders and Otley.
Polachek, James M. (1992). The Inner Opium War. Council of East Asian Studies.
Thomson, John (1873). Illustrations of China and Its People. London: Sampson Low, Marston, Low, and Searle.
Tsai, Shih-shan Henry (2009). Maritime Taiwan: Historical Encounters with the East and the West. London: Routledge. .

Further reading 
Journals Kept by Mr. Gully and Capt. Denham During a Captivity in China in the Year 1842. London: Chapman and Hall. 1844.
Patridge, Dan (1876). British Captives in China; An Account of the Shipwreck on the Island of Formosa, of the Brig "Ann". London: Wertheimer, Lea and Co.

1841 in China
1841 in Taiwan
1842 in China
August 1842 events
Conflicts in 1841
First Opium War
Massacres in Taiwan
People executed by the Qing dynasty by decapitation